The 11th Tank Battalion "M.O. Calzecchi" is an inactive tank battalion of the Italian Army based in Ozzano dell'Emilia  in Emilia Romagna. Like all Italian tank units, the battalion was originally part of the infantry, but since 1 June 1999 it has been part of the cavalry. Operationally the battalion was last assigned to the Mechanized Brigade "Friuli".

History 
The battalion was formed during the 1975 army reform: on 1 August 1975 the XI Armored Battalion of the Infantry Brigade "Trieste" was renamed 11th Tank Battalion "M.O. Calzecchi". The 11th Calzecchi was granted a new flag on 12 November 1976 by decree 846 of the President of the Italian Republic Giovanni Leone. The battalion received the traditions of the XI Tank Battalion "M", which had been formed by the 4th Tank Infantry Regiment on 30 April 1941. The battalion joined 133rd Tank Infantry Regiment and was sent to Italian Libya on 14 January 1942 to fight in the Western Desert Campaign. In Libya the battalion was transferred from the 133rd regiment to the 101st Motorised Division "Trieste" on 2 April 1942. The battalion entered the front during the Battle of Bir Hakeim and continued to serve in the North African theater until it was annihilated on 2 November 1942 during the Second Battle of El Alamein.

After World War II the XI Tank Battalion was reformed in Forlì on 16 May 1960 as armored unit of the Infantry Brigade "Trieste".

Tank and armored battalions created during the 1975 army reform were all named for officers, soldiers and partisans, who were posthumously awarded Italy's highest military honor the Gold Medal of Military Valour for heroism during World War II. The 11th Tank Battalion's name commemorated 33rd Tank Infantry Regiment Captain Icilio Calzecchi, who had served in the XI Tank Battalion "M" and was killed in action on 29 May 1942 during the Battle of Bir Hakeim. Equipped with Leopard 1A2 main battle tanks the battalion joined the Mechanized Brigade "Trieste".

After the end of the Cold War the Italian Army began to draw down its forces on 1 June 1991 the Mechanized Brigade "Trieste" was merged into the Motorized Brigade "Friuli". On 18 September 1992 the 11th Tank Battalion "M.O. Calzecchi" reformed as 4th Tank Regiment. On 1 September 1993 the 4th Tank Regiment swapped its flag, name and traditions with the 33rd Tank Regiment, which at this time were assigned to the 6th Tank Battalion "M.O. Scapuzzi" in Civitavecchia. After the swap the 11th Tank Battalion "M.O. Calzecchi" was now the sole battalion of the 33rd Tank Regiment.

As the Friuli brigade was earmarked to become Italy's only Air Assault brigade the 33rd Tank Regiment was transferred to the 132nd Armored Brigade "Ariete" in 1997. In 2001 the 33rd tank regiment was disbanded and the flags of the 33rd regiment and 11th battalion were transferred to the Shrine of the Flags in the Vittoriano in Rome.

See also 
 Mechanized Brigade "Trieste"
 Mechanized Brigade "Friuli"

References

Tank Battalions of Italy